Coniferyl aldehyde is an organic compound with the formula HO(CH3O)C6H3CH=CHCHO.  It is a derivative of cinnamaldehyde, featuring 4-hydroxy and 3-methoxy substituents. It is a major precursor to lignin.

Biosynthetic role
In sweetgum (Liquidambar styraciflua), coniferyl aldehyde is a precursor to sinapaldehyde via hydroxylation mediated by coniferyl aldehyde 5-hydroxylase.

Coniferyl aldehyde is reduced to coniferyl alcohol by the action of dehydrogenase enzymes. 

It is found in Senra incana (Hibisceae). It is a low molecular weight phenol that is susceptible to extraction from cork stoppers into wine.

See also 
 Phenolic compounds in wine

References 

O-methylated phenylpropanoids
Conjugated aldehydes
Vinylogous carboxylic acids